{{Infobox person
| name               = Kunal Jaisingh
| image              = Kunal Jaisingh.png
| caption            = Jaisingh in 2019
| birth_date         = 
| nationality        = Indian
| occupation         = Actor
| notable_works      = The Buddy ProjectIshqbaaazDil Boley Oberoi
| years_active       = 2011–present
| spouse             = 
}}

Kunal Jaisingh (born 29 July 1989) is an Indian television actor best known for his portrayal of Ranveer Shergill in The Buddy Project and Omkara Singh Oberoi in Ishqbaaaz and Dil Boley Oberoi.

Personal life
Jaisingh met Bharati Kumar on the sets of The Buddy Project and the two dated for around five years. They got engaged on 18 March 2018 and married each other on 20 December 2018 in Mumbai.

Career
Jaisingh started his career with Mann Kee Awaaz Pratigya where he played a mute guy.

His breakthrough came in 2012 with Channel V India's The Buddy Project where he portrayed Ranveer Shergill.

Jaisingh went onto be a part of various anthology series like Yeh Hai Aashiqui, Twist Wala Love, Pyaar Tune Kya Kiya, Savdhaan India etc. In 2015, he played Chiku in Zee TV's Doli Armaano Ki.

From 2016 to 2018, he played Omkara Singh Oberoi in Ishqbaaaz opposite Shrenu Parikh for which he won the Gold Award and Indian Telly Award for Best Actor In Supporting Role. Jaisingh also portrayed the same character in 2017 in the show's spin off, Dil Boley Oberoi.

In 2019, he played Ruhaan in Voot's Silsila Badalte Rishton Ka opposite Tejasswi Prakash and Aneri Vajani . In 2020, Jaisingh portrayed Reyansh Khurana in Colors TV's Pavitra Bhagya opposite Aneri Vajani. In 2021, he appear in Sony TV's show Kyun Utthe Dil Chhod Aaye'' as Prince Veer Pratap Singh.

Filmography

Television

Special appearance

Web series

Short film

Music video

Awards and nominations

See also 
 List of Indian television actors

References

External links 

1990 births
Living people
Male actors from Mumbai
Indian male soap opera actors
Male actors in Hindi television
21st-century Indian male actors
Indian male television actors